Mordy  is a town in Siedlce County, Masovian Voivodeship, Poland, with 1,831 inhabitants (2004).

History of Mordy

Jewish Community
After the First World War there were approximately 1,800 Jews in Mordy - more than half of its population. They were mostly employed in trade and peddling, while a few were tradesmen -  mainly tailors and cobblers. The community ran a fund for loans underwritten by The Joint. There were several Hasidic Shtiebels in town, as well as Zionist parties such as the Bund and Agudat Yisrael. There was a Jewish public library and a Jewish culture club.

In 1920 Polish troops killed several leaders of the Bund, accused of supporting the Bolsheviks during the Polish-Soviet War.

The German army invaded Mordy in September 1939, but left after two days. The Red Army replaced the Germans only to retreat after some two weeks, and Germans re-captured the town. In the following months Mordy, being close to the Bug River, served as a transit point for thousands of Jews who tried to move into the area controlled by the Soviets. Moshe Gershon Levenberg, a former chairman of the community, served as the head of the Judenrat, which was established in autumn of 1939.
Many Jews were recruited as forced labor in a camp near Mordy, to drain swamps, together with Jews from other near-by towns. During 1940 an influx of Jewish refugees into the town began, and at the year's end, the number of Jews rose to about 2,000. In the spring of 1941, five-hundred Jews were brought to the camp from Warsaw.
In November 1941, a Jewish ghetto was established with 3,360 residents. At the end of 1941, Jewish refugees were brought into the ghetto, and by May 1942 the number of inhabitants rose to 3817. At the beginning of 1942 the SS executed some Jews who smuggled food. During May and June 1942, some 450 Jewish refugees arrived from Łódź, Kraków and other places.

The Mordy ghetto was liquidated on August 22, 1942. All residents, about 4,500 people were transferred to Siedlce, then deported to Treblinka extermination camp together with Jews from other places in the area.

References

External links
 Jewish Community in Mordy on Virtual Shtetl

Cities and towns in Masovian Voivodeship
Siedlce County
Lublin Governorate
Lublin Voivodeship (1919–1939)
Holocaust locations in Poland